Athini is a small village in Hassan district of Karnataka state, India.

Location
Athini is located on the village road between Holenarasipura and Gorur dam. Aside from Gorur, nearby places include Karle, Chikkanahalli, Ganjalagodu and Arkalgud.

Demographics
Covering  and comprising 210 households at the time of the 2011 census of India, Athini had a population of 989. There were 491 males and 498 females, with 91 people being aged six or younger.

Post services
There is a post office in Athini and the PIN code is 573120.

Gallery

See also
 Kadavina Hosahalli

References

Villages in Hassan district